The Wihuri Sibelius Prize is a music prize awarded by the Wihuri Foundation for International Prizes to prominent composers who have become internationally known and acknowledged. The Wihuri Sibelius Prize is one of the biggest and most prestigious music prizes in the world of classical music. The first Sibelius Prize was awarded to Finnish composer Jean Sibelius, whom the prize was named after, in 1953. By 2021, the Wihuri Foundation for International Prizes has awarded altogether 19 Wihuri Sibelius Prizes, the latest award climbing up to €150,000 and awarded to Finnish composer Jukka Tiensuu. The Wihuri Sibelius Prize winner is selected by a five-member committee that consists of experts from Finnish music institutions. The prize may be awarded to private individuals or organizations regardless of nationality.

Prizewinners

References

External links
 

International music awards
Classical music awards
Awards established in 1953
Finnish music awards
Things named after Jean Sibelius